The Bristol F.2 Fighter is a British First World War two-seat biplane fighter and reconnaissance aircraft developed by Frank Barnwell at the Bristol Aeroplane Company. It is often simply called the Bristol Fighter, "Brisfit" or "Biff".

Although the type was intended initially as a replacement for the pre-war Royal Aircraft Factory B.E.2c reconnaissance aircraft, the new Rolls-Royce Falcon V12 engine gave it the performance of a fighter.

Despite a disastrous start to its career, the definitive F.2B version proved to be a manoeuvrable aircraft that was able to hold its own against single-seat fighters while its robust design ensured that it remained in military service into the early 1930s. Some surplus aircraft were registered for civilian use, and versions with passenger cabins were converted.

Development

Origins
In the Autumn of 1915, the Royal Flying Corps (RFC) needed a new aerial reconnaissance and artillery spotting aircraft to replace the pre-war Royal Aircraft Factory B.E.2c. Among other attributes and performance requirements, emphasis was placed upon the ability to defend itself in aerial combat.

Several new types were developed; the Royal Aircraft Factory offered its R.E.8 design and Armstrong Whitworth produced the design that eventually emerged as the F.K.8. In March 1916, Frank Barnwell of the Bristol Aeroplane Company, commenced work on a replacement for the B.E.2. This initially took two forms, the Type 9 R.2A, to be powered by the 120 hp Beardmore engine and the similar Type 9A R.2B, powered by the 150 hp Hispano-Suiza. Both designs had the fuselage mounted between the wings, with a gap between the lower longerons and the wing, along with a substantial part of the fin beneath the fuselage. These features were intended to improve the field of fire for the observer; the positioning of the fuselage also resulted in the upper wing obscuring less of the pilot's field of view. The crew positions were placed as close together as possible, to help communication between the pilot and observer.

Before either the R.2A or R.2B could be built, the new 190 hp (142 kW) Rolls-Royce Falcon inline engine became available. Barnwell drafted a third revision of his design around the new engine, with its decidedly superior power/weight ratio. The anticipated improvement in performance changed the emphasis in its intended operational use; it was now seen as a replacement for the F.E.2d and Sopwith 1½ Strutter two-seat fighters, rather than a competitor with the pedestrian reconnaissance designs that were to replace the B.E.2. The resulting Type 12 F.2A, was a two-bay equal-span biplane, closely based on the R.2A and R.2B designs.

Prototypes

In July 1916, work commenced on the construction of a pair of prototypes; on 28 August 1916, an initial contract was awarded for fifty production aircraft. On 9 September 1916, the first prototype performed its maiden flight, powered by a Falcon I engine. It was fitted with B.E.2d wings (Bristol were major contractors for the type) to save time; its lower wings were attached to an open wing-anchorage frame and had end-plates at the wing roots. On 25 October 1916, the second prototype was completed, powered by a Hispano-Suiza engine and differing from the first prototype in its tail-skid, which was integrated into the base of the rudder.

It was found that the prototype's radiator arrangement obscured the pilot's field of view and the nose was redesigned around a new circular-shaped frontal radiator in the cowling. Other changes made to the first prototype during flight testing included the elimination of the end-plates from the lower wing roots and the addition of a shallow coaming around the cockpits. Between 16 and 18 October 1916, the type underwent its official trials at the Central Flying School, Upavon, during which it was tested with a four-bladed 9 ft 2 in propeller and a two-bladed 9 ft 8 in propeller. By the time of its arrival at the experimental armament station at Orfordness it had also been fitted with a Scarff ring mounting over the rear cockpit and an Aldis optical sight.

Only 52 F.2A aircraft were manufactured before production began of the definitive model, the F.2B (retrospectively named Bristol Type 14), which first flew on 25 October 1916. The first 150 or so F.2Bs were powered by either the Falcon I or Falcon II engine but the remainder were equipped with the 275 hp (205 kW) Falcon III.

Armament

The Bristol F.2 Fighter was armed in what had by then become standard for a British two-seater military aircraft: one synchronised fixed, forward-firing .303 in (7.7 mm) Vickers machine gun (in this case mounted under the cowling to avoid freezing) and a .303 in (7.7 mm) Lewis Gun on a Scarff ring over the observer's rear cockpit. The F.2B often carried a second Lewis gun on the rear cockpit mounting, although observers found the weight of the twin Lewis gun mounting difficult to handle in the high altitudes at which combat increasingly took place in the last year of the war, many preferring one gun. Attempts were made to add a forward-firing Lewis gun on a Foster mounting or similar on the upper wing either instead of (or with) the Vickers gun. Among other problems this caused interference with the pilot's compass, which was mounted on the trailing edge of the upper wing: to minimise this effect the Lewis gun was offset to starboard.

Alternative engines
Rolls-Royce aero engines of all types were in short supply, which frustrated plans to increase production to enable the F.2B to become the standard British two-seater, replacing the R.E.8 and F.K.8. Efforts were made to find an available alternative powerplant that was both reliable and sufficiently powerful. The Type 15 was fitted with a 200 hp (150 kW) Sunbeam Arab engine. In expectation of a reduction in performance with the less powerful engine, it was planned to supply the Arab-powered Fighters to the "corps" reconnaissance squadrons, reserving Falcon powered examples for fighter–reconnaissance operations. The Arab engine was to be fitted to Fighters produced by sub-contractors under licence, while Bristol-built Fighters would continue to use the Falcon.

In the event the Arab engine was not a success; it was found to suffer from serious weaknesses in cylinder and crank-chamber design that led, among other faults, to chronic and severe vibration, while the cooling system also required repeated modification. The "Arab Bristol" was never to become a viable combination, in spite of prolonged development. A few Arab-engined Bristols were at the front late in the war but the British reconnaissance squadrons had to soldier on with the R.E.8 and F.K.8 until the end of hostilities. The Type 16 was fitted with a 200 hp (150 kW) Hispano-Suiza engine. This worked better than the Arab but there was already a severe shortage of Hispano-Suizas for other types, such as the S.E.5a and the Sopwith Dolphin. The 300 hp (220 kW) version of the Hispano-Suiza, suggested for the Type 17, was not available in quantity before the end of the war.

Other engines tried or suggested for the F.2B were the 200 hp (150 kW) RAF 4d, the 180 hp (130 kW) Wolseley Viper and the 230 hp (170 kW) Siddeley Puma. Trials of the Puma engine were carried out in February 1918; it was found to confer marginally better performance than the Hispano-Suiza and Arab engines but was difficult to install and unreliable. In September 1918, trials of a high-compression model of the Puma were carried out but it was found to have no significant performance benefit and this avenue was not pursued. The Type 22 was a proposed version adapted for a radial or rotary engine, either a 200 hp (150 kW) Salmson radial, a 300 hp (220 kW) ABC Dragonfly radial (Type 22A) or a 230 hp (170 kW) Bentley B.R.2 rotary (Type 22B). The type number was eventually used for the Bristol F.2C Badger, a completely new design.

The All-Metal Bristol Fighter
The Bristol M.R.1 is often described as an all-metal version of the F.2b but was a new design, although its fuselage was positioned between the upper and lower wing as with the F.2b. Two prototypes were built; the first flew on 23 October 1917, but the M.R.1 never entered mass production.

American versions

When the US entered the war, the Aviation Section, U.S. Signal Corps of the United States Army lacked any competitive combat aircraft either in inventory or under construction. On 1 August 1917, General John Pershing, the commander of the American Expeditionary Forces on the Western Front, issued his personal recommendation for the Bristol Fighter to be built in the United States, leading to plans for the development and production of an American version of the Fighter by the United States Army Engineering Division.

Original proposals for American production had the  Hispano-Suiza engine. On 5 September 1917, a F.2B Fighter was delivered to the Smithsonian Institution, Washington, United States. Attempts to begin production in the United States floundered due to the decision by Colonel V. E. Clark of the Bolling Commission to redesign the Fighter to be powered by the  Liberty L-12 engine. The Liberty was unsuitable for the Bristol, as it was far too heavy, bulky and the aircraft had a nose-heavy attitude during flight.

A contract for 1,000 aircraft was placed initially with the Fisher Body Corporation then cancelled and reallocated to the Curtiss Aeroplane and Motor Company. On 7 December 1917, the order was doubled to 2,000 aircraft. On 25 January 1918, the first aircraft, which was given the name U.S.A 0-1, was completed, despite the misgivings of Barnwell, who was not satisfied with some of the modifications made, particularly in the use of the Liberty L-12 engine. According to Bruce, misdirections attributed to Major E. J. Hall of the U.S. Signals Corps had led to roughly 1,400 production drawings produced by Curtiss being rendered obsolete. The reputation of the type was also tarnished by three early crashes, although one had been attributed to pilot error and the other two to faulty workmanship.  Only 27 O-1s were completed.

Efforts to change the engine of American-built Bristol Fighters to the more suitable Liberty 8 or the  Wright-Hisso came up against political as well as technical problems. By July 1918, the only specimen of the American-built Hispano-Suiza engine had been installed in a Fighter; the combination soon gained the favour of the U.S. Air Board, which suggested to Curtiss that all work on the 400 horsepower Liberty L-12 version of the aircraft be abandoned in favour of the Hispano-Suiza version. In spite of protests by Curtiss, the contracts for the U.S.A. 0-1 were terminated, leading to only a pair of prototypes and 25 production aircraft out of the planned 2,000 aircraft being constructed.

W. C. Potter, Assistant Director of Aircraft Production, suggested that the original Bristol Fighter should be produced exactly as per Barnwell's original design, save for the use of either the Liberty 8 or Hispano-Suiza engine. Potter's proposal was overlooked; instead it was decided to produce eight aircraft, four being fitted with the Hispano-Suiza engine, as the Engineering Division USB-1A and four being powered by the Liberty L-8 engine, as the Engineering Division USB-1B; only one each were built.

In 1918, the Dayton-Wright Company designed a modified version, designated as the B-1A or XB-1A which used a 330-hp Wright-Hispano engine in a "new fuselage of wood-veneer monocoque construction". A later version was designated as the XB-1B and was equipped with the same engine. The XB-1A was armed with a pair of Marlin machine guns at the pilot's position while the XB-1B was armed with a pair of Browning machine guns. These aircraft were reportedly intended for use as night observation aircraft. Three prototypes were built by the Engineering division at McCook Field, with a further 44 aircraft built by the Dayton-Wright Company. According to Bruce, despite substantial efforts to differentiate and modify the aircraft's design, none of the American-built Fighters performed any better than the original Bristol. While some of the modified versions of the F.2 were used in the US, no American-built Bristol Fighters reached the American Expeditionary Forces in France.

Postwar developments
Postwar developments of the F.2B included the F.2B Mk II, a two-seat army co-operation biplane, fitted with desert equipment and a tropical cooling system, which first flew in December 1919, of which 435 were built. The Type 96 Fighter Mk III and Type 96A Fighter Mk VI were structurally strengthened aircraft, of which 50 were built in 1926–1927. Surplus F.2Bs were modified for civilian use.

Operational history

Days prior to Christmas 1916, the first deliveries of production F.2A Fighters were completed, 48 Squadron at Rendcomb being the first operational unit of the Royal Flying Corps (RFC) to receive the type. On 8 March 1917, 48 Squadron was transferred to France in preparation for action on the Western Front; Hugh Trenchard, 1st Viscount Trenchard was keen to get the F.2A Fighter and other new aircraft ready for the Second Battle of Arras, aiming to surprise German forces with a new type, and this led to restriction on its deployment prior to the battle to avoid alerting the Germans.

The first offensive action that involved the F.2A Fighter crossing the frontline occurred on 5 April 1917, which had been timed to coincide with the British offensive at Arras. The very first F.2A patrol of six aircraft from 48 Squadron RFC, led by William Leefe Robinson VC, ran into five Albatros D.IIIs from Jasta 11 led by Manfred von Richthofen. Four out of the six F.2As were shot down – including that of Robinson, who was captured – and a fifth was badly damaged.

Other early experiences with the F.2A Fighter contributed to doubts over its effectiveness. The month in which the type had been introduced to offensive operations became known as Bloody April; casualties were high throughout the RFC and the Bristol fighter proved to be no exception. Contemporary two-seater aircraft were far less nimble than fighter aircraft, and many types lacked the structural strength to carry out the aggressive manoeuvres needed for dogfighting. The first "Brisfit" aircrews were accustomed to the standard doctrine of maintaining formation and using the crossfire of the observers' guns to counter enemy fighter aircraft.

Pilots soon realised that the Bristol Fighter was a strong and agile aircraft, capable of manoeuvring with single-seat fighters, despite some rumours that the type lacked the structural strength to be flown as a fighter. While its fixed forward-firing machine gun could be used as the primary weapon, the observer could use his flexible, rear-mounted gun to provide protection from attacks from the rear. Flown in this manner, the Bristol Fighter achieved a 'remarkable' level of success and proved to be a formidable opponent for German fighters.

From May 1917 onwards, the definitive F.2B Fighter quickly supplanted the earlier F.2A model. In July 1917, the War Office decided to adopt the F.2B Fighter as the equipment of all fighter-reconnaissance squadrons, leading to a significant increase in production. Despite the issuing of contracts for further large batches of aircraft, it was apparent that the rate of production could not keep up with demand for the type.

Perhaps one of the best known flying aces to use the type was Canadian Andrew McKeever, and his regular observer L. F. Powell. By the end of 1917 McKeever had accumulated 30 victories and Powell had achieved eight, while operating the Fighter. McKeever later became a flying instructor stationed in England before becoming the commanding officer of 1 Squadron of the new Royal Canadian Air Force (RCAF), where he continued to use the Fighter as his personal aircraft, which was later transferred to Canada.

Near the end of the war, the Bristol Fighter was used in a pioneering new capability in the form of radio communications; 11 Squadron was the first such squadron to be equipped. Only the flight commander's Fighter would be equipped with a transmitter while others were outfitted with receivers, allowing for one-way communication of orders; as the trailing aerials employed needed to be wound in prior to aerial combat, this requirement reduced the usefulness of the system. The Fighter also participated in experiments held by the Royal Aircraft Establishment (RAE) into the use of parachutes, resulting in several aircraft being modified to carry static-line parachutes within the underside of the fuselage; these trials continued following the signing of the Armistice.

In September and October 1917, orders for 1,600 F.2B Fighters were placed; by the end of the First World War, the Royal Air Force (RAF) had a total of 1,583 F.2Bs in squadron service; it was in service with six reconnaissance squadrons stationed in France and five Home Defence squadrons, while further squadrons operating the type in the Middle East and Italy. A total of 5,329 aircraft were eventually constructed, mostly by Bristol but also by Standard Motors, Armstrong Whitworth and even the Cunard Steamship Company. According to Bruce, by the time of the Armistice of 11 November 1918, the "Bristol Fighter ended the war supreme in its class".

Postwar
Following the end of the war, the F.2B Fighter was soon adopted by the RAF as its standard army cooperation machine. The type continued to operate in army cooperation and light bombing roles in the British Empire, in particular the Middle East and India. In line with this role, which led to its use in a hot climate, Bristol introduced models of the Fighter equipped with 'tropical' radiators and provision for desert equipment. There had also been considerations made into deploying the Fighter as a carrier-based aircraft, which led to an engineless airframe participating in immersion trials in November 1918 and an aircraft being used in deck landing tests, reportedly on board .

It was not until 1932 that the F.2B was withdrawn from RAF service, the last "Brisfit" unit being 20 Squadron stationed in India. The type lasted a further three years in New Zealand. Surplus aircraft were allocated to ADC Aircraft, a British company established to act as a seller for wartime aircraft, which passed on large quantities of Fighters to other nations, normally to military operators. Bristol also continued to manufacture and refurbish the type for some time. During the 1920s Bristol proceeded to develop and introduce numerous variants and derivatives of the Fighter, typically capable of carrying higher loads, revised tail units and strengthened undercarriages.

The F.2B Fighter was adopted by the New Zealand Permanent Air Force and the Royal Australian Air Force (RAAF), as well as by the air forces of Belgium, Canada, Ireland, Greece, Mexico, Norway, Peru, Spain and Sweden. According to Bruce, relatively few Fighters entered service with the air forces of the various Commonwealth nations, greater quantities having been sold to other nations. Belgium purchased several from ADC Aircraft, and later arranged to produce the Fighter under licence at Sociétés Anonyme Belge de Constructions Aéronautiques (SABCA).

In 1920 Poland bought 106 Bristol Fighters (104 with Hispano-Suiza 300 hp/220 kW engines, two with Falcon IIIs) (other sources claim 107). Thus it became the second largest user of this type. It was also one of the most numerous Polish aircraft at that time. Forty Fighters were used during the Polish-Soviet War from July 1920, among others in the Battle of Warsaw, performing reconnaissance and close air support. The rest of the order became operational only after the end of hostilities. During the war, a pair were shot down by ground fire, while another was captured by the Soviets and several more were lost in crashes. Survivors of the conflict continued in Polish service in the reconnaissance and training roles until 1932.

Operators

 Afghan Air Force operated three aircraft from 1919 and retired them by 1929.

 Argentine Army Aviation Service - purchased 28 aircraft from 1920 to 1924, with a further 10 built under license by FMA from 1930 to 1931. Retired in 1932.

 Australian Flying Corps operated the Bristol Fighter from 1917 to 1918.
 No. 1 Squadron in Palestine
 No. 6 (Training) Squadron in the United Kingdom

 Belgian Air Force

 Bolivian Air Force

 Canadian Air Board
 Royal Canadian Air Force

 Honduran Air Force - Honduras received a single F2.B in 1921, its first military aircraft. It was burned during an attempted revolution in 1924.

 Irish Air Service
 Irish Air Corps

 Hellenic Air Force
 Hellenic Navy

 Mexican Air Force

 New Zealand Permanent Air Force operated seven Bristol F.2B Fighters from 1919 to 1936. During its 16 years of service with the NZPAF, it was used as an army co-operation, aerial-survey and advanced training aircraft.

 Norwegian Army Air Service purchased five aircraft in 1922.

 Peruvian Air Force - Three F.2Bs were purchased in 1921. They were grounded by engine problems and a lack of spare parts in 1923 and scrapped.

 Polish Air Force operated 107 Bristol F.2B Fighters in 1920–1932.

 Soviet Air Force operated two aircraft.
 Kingdom of Spain
 Aeronáutica Militar

 Royal Swedish Air Force operated one aircraft only

 Royal Yugoslav Air Force operated one aircraft only.

 Royal Flying Corps / Royal Air Force

 No. 2 Squadron RAF
 No. 4 Squadron RAF
 No. 5 Squadron RAF
 No. 6 Squadron RAF
 No. 8 Squadron RAF
 No. 9 Squadron RAF
 No. 10 Squadron RAF
 No. 11 Squadron RAF
 No. 12 Squadron RAF
 No. 13 Squadron RAF
 No. 14 Squadron RAF
 No. 16 Squadron RAF
 No. 20 Squadron RAF

 No. 22 Squadron RAF
 No. 24 Squadron RAF
 No. 28 Squadron RAF
 No. 31 Squadron RAF
 No. 33 Squadron RAF
 No. 34 Squadron RAF
 No. 35 Squadron RAF
 No. 36 Squadron RAF
 No. 39 Squadron RAF
 No. 48 Squadron RAF
 No. 62 Squadron RAF
 No. 67 Squadron RAF
 No. 75 Squadron RAF

 No. 76 Squadron RAF
 No. 81 Squadron RAF
 No. 88 Squadron RAF
 No. 100 Squadron RAF
 No. 105 Squadron RAF
 No. 111 Squadron RAF
 No. 114 Squadron RAF
 No. 138 Squadron RAF
 No. 139 Squadron RAF
 No. 140 Squadron RAF
 No. 141 Squadron RAF
 No. 186 Squadron RAF
 No. 208 Squadron RAF

Survivors
There are three airworthy Bristol Fighters as of 2007 (and several replicas):
 The Shuttleworth Collection contains one airworthy F.2B Fighter, identity D8096, that still flies during the British summer.
 The Canada Aviation and Space Museum, in Ottawa, Ontario, owns a second example, D-7889.
 The New Zealand film director Peter Jackson owns D-8084, which flies from the Hood Aerodrome, in Masterson. The Omaka Aviation Heritage Centre, at Omaka Aerodrome, Blenheim holds a second, original fuselage.

Substantially original aircraft are on static display at the:
 Royal Air Force Museum London, UK
 Imperial War Museum Duxford, UK
 Museo del Aire, Madrid, Spain
 Musée Royal de l'Armée, Brussels, Belgium
 Polish Aviation Museum, Kraków

Restorations of original airframes include:
 Original fuselage being rebuilt into a flyable aircraft, Ross Walton Family Collection, Bardstown, Kentucky.
 In 2016, Aerospace Bristol, Filton Airfield, Bristol, UK, purchased an airframe from a private collection in the US for restoration and display in its new museum.  This sale was erroneously reported to be from Ross Walton.

In addition, a number of replicas are operated or displayed in locations around the world. These include:
 Engineers at Rolls-Royce, Airbus and GKN Aerospace-Filton have built a full-scale replica F.2B in celebration of 100 years of aircraft manufacture at Filton Bristol, where the original fighters were designed and built.

Specifications (F.2B)

See also

References

Notes

Citations

Bibliography
 Barnes, C. H. Bristol Aircraft since 1910. London: Putnam, 1964. 
 Barnes, C. H. Bristol Aircraft since 1910 (2nd ed). London: Putnam, 1970. .
 Bruce, J. M. "The Bristol Fighter". Flight, 7 November 1952, pp. 587–591. 
 Bruce, J. M. "Aircraft Profile No. 21: The Bristol Fighter". Profile Publications Ltd, 1965.
 Bruce, J. M. "Bristol's Fighter Par Excellence". Air Enthusiast, Thirty-five, January–April 1988. pp. 24–47. .
 Bruce, J. M. Warplanes of the First World War, Vol. 1. London: Macdonald, 1965.
 Cheesman, E. F. (ed). Fighter Aircraft of the 1914–1918 War. Letchworth, Harleyford, UK: Aero Publishers, Inc., 1960.
 
 Gutman, J. Bristol F2 Fighter Aces of World War 1. London: Osprey Publishing, 2007. .
 Hare, Paul R. Fokker Fodder. United Kingdom: Fonthill, 2012. .
 Holmes, Tony. "Database: Bristol Fighter". Aeroplane, June 2015, Vol. 43, No. 6. pp. 79–93. .
 
 Kopański, Tomasz Jan. Samoloty brytyjskie w lotnictwie polskim 1918–1930 (British Aircraft in the Polish Air Force 1918–1930) (in Polish). Bellona, Warsaw: 2001. .
 
 Morgała, Andrzej. Samoloty wojskowe w Polsce 1918-1924 [Military aircraft in Poland 1918-1924] (in Polish). Warsaw: Lampart, 1997. .
 Rivas, Santiago. British Combat Aircraft in Latin America. Manchester, UK: Crécy Publishing, 2019. .
 
 Wegg, John. General Dynamics Aircraft and Their Predecessors. London: Putnam, 1990. .

External links

 Austin & Longbridge Aircraft Production
 Bristol F.2B – World Military Aircraft
 Photo of a US version of the Bristol F.2 Fighter – the Dayton-Wright XB-1A
 Sound recordings of the Bristol Fighter preserved by the Shuttleworth collection

Single-engined tractor aircraft
Biplanes
1910s British fighter aircraft
F.2 Fighter
Military aircraft of World War I
Aircraft first flown in 1916